Orekhov is the name of several rural localities in Russia:
Orekhov, Republic of Adygea, a khutor in Shovgenovsky District of the Republic of Adygea
Orekhov, Rostov Oblast, a khutor in Bokovsky District of Rostov Oblast
Orekhov, Volgograd Oblast, a khutor in Kletsky District of Volgograd Oblast

Historical names
Orekhov or Oreshek, former name of Shlisselburg, a town in Leningrad Oblast